Kazan-Passazhirskaya is a railway station in the capital of Tatarstan — Kazan in Russia.

Main information
It includes the main building (a city landmark built in 1896), suburban terminal (built in 1967 and renovated in 2005) and the service building, as well as a number of office buildings (all built in the late 20th or early 21st century). The railway station serves the 36 pairs of long-distance trains (including 13 of local formation) as well as commuter trains and diesel trains (rail bus) sent from the corresponding dead-end platforms in the western and eastern directions. Per year the station serves more than 8 million passengers. It has 15 routes, several low platforms and an elevated passage above the tracks.

History
The station was opened shortly after the construction of the Moscow-Kazan railway in 1893. In Soviet times the station was run by the Kazan Branch of the Gorky Railway. In 1992 the main building suffered a severe fire and was rebuilt by 1997. By the Millennium of Kazan in 2005 the suburban terminal and the square before the main building underwent reconstruction.

As a preparation for the 2013 Summer Universiade, Russian Railways plans to create a high-speed rail service between the station and the airport (Aeroexpress). After the reconstruction of the available industrial tracks and construction of new ones, trains are expected to go at speeds of about 120 kilometers per hour, which will allow passengers to travel from the station to the airport in 25 minutes. A new transit rail and bus station is currently constructed in the city for the upcoming Universiade, and the old railway station, apart from being the Aeroexpresses terminal, will only be used to accept the local formation and commuter trains.

Trains
This is a list of trains that pass the station:

 Moscow — Kazan
 Yekaterinburg — Moscow
 Nizhny Novgorod — Kazan
 St.Petersburg — Kazan
 Novosibirsk — Adler
 Adler — Kazan
 Brest — Kazan
 Gomel — Kazan
 Minsk — Kazan
 Anapa — Kazan
 Astrakhan — Kazan
 Bishkek — Kazan
 Novorossiysk — Kazan
 Almaty — Kazan
 Novy Urengoy — Kazan
 Samara — Kazan
 Tashkent — Kazan
 Kislovodsk — Kazan
 Adler — Barnaul
 Anapa — Izhevsk
 Nizhny Novgorod — Izhevsk
 Kirov — Kislovodsk
 Kirov — Samara
 Kislovodsk — Yekaterinburg
 Moscow — Krugloye Pole
 Moscow — Neryungri
 Moscow — Nizhnevartovsk
 Volgograd — Nizhnevartovsk
 Moscow — Tommot
 Moscow — Ulan-Ude
 Moscow — Yekaterinburg
 Moscow — Vladivostok

Criticism

Gallery

References

External links

Railway stations in Tatarstan
Railway stations in the Russian Empire opened in 1896
Gorky Railway
Cultural heritage monuments of regional significance in Tatarstan